The Passage is the ninth full-length studio album of Italian progressive metal band DGM. This is the third album with this line-up and it was released on August 26, 2016 for the first time by Italian label Frontiers Records. The album was produced by band guitarist Simone Mularoni.

On June 13 Animal was released as its first single and on August 15 Fallen was released.

Track listing
All music written by Mark Basile and Simone Mularoni. All lyrics written by Basile, Mularoni, Andrea Arcangeli, Fabio Costantino and Luigi Sanese.

Personnel
 Mark Basile – vocals
 Simone Mularoni – guitars
 Andrea Arcangeli – bass
 Fabio Costantino – drums
 Emanuele Casali – keyboards

Additional personnel
 Tom Englund – guest vocals on Ghosts of Insanity
 Michael Romeo – guest guitar solo on Dogma
 Andrea Anastasi – additional orchestration on The Secret (Part I)

References

2016 albums
DGM (band) albums
Frontiers Records albums